Busoa is an Austronesian language spoken in the villages of Busoa and Lakambau in South Buton Regency on Buton Island, off the southeast coast of Sulawesi in Indonesia.

References

Muna–Buton languages
Languages of Sulawesi